Petra Morsbach (born 1 June 1956) is a German author.

Life and career

Morsbach was born in Zürich, but grew up in Germany. She studied at Munich University and Leningrad Theater Academy.

Morsbach's first novel, Plötzlich ist es Abend (Suddenly it's Evening), was published in 1995 and follows the life of a Russian woman whose family was prosecuted by Joseph Stalin.

Opernroman, her second novel, was published in 1998 and is based on Morsbach's experience working in theatre for a decade. It is set in the fictional town of Neustadt am Rhein and centers around the local opera company throughout a season.

Her novel Gottesdiener (God's Servant) was published in 2004 and follows the life of an elderly Catholic priest.

She won the Jean-Paul-Preis with her 2013 book, Dichterliebe which is centered around a poet who is going through an existential crisis.

Her novel, Justizpalast (Palace of Justice) was published in 2017 and won the Wilhelm Raabe Literature Prize. The novel is a biography of a fictional judge called Thirza Zorniger. Morsbach spent 9 years researching the justice system for the book.

Bibliography

Dissertation

References

External links

Living people
1956 births
20th-century German women writers
21st-century German women writers
20th-century German novelists
21st-century German non-fiction writers
German women novelists
German women non-fiction writers
Ludwig Maximilian University of Munich alumni